Papyrus Oxyrhynchus 1231 (P. Oxy. 1231 or P. Oxy. X 1231) is a papyrus discovered at Oxyrhynchus in Egypt, first published in 1914 by Bernard Pyne Grenfell and Arthur Surridge Hunt.  The papyrus preserves fragments of the second half of Book I of a Hellenistic edition of the poetry of the archaic poet Sappho.

The papyrus comes from a second century AD roll, and is made up of 56 smaller fragments.  The largest piece, fragment one, measures 17.7 cm × 13.2 cm; it covers two columns and includes fragments of four poems. It is written in a small informal upright hand, and corrections and marginalia have been added in a second hand, using a different ink.

The papyrus preserves a number of fragments by Sappho.  Fragment one of the papyrus preserves four consecutive fragments; frr. 15, 16, 17, and 18 in Voigt's edition.  Also preserved, on fragment 56 of the papyrus, is the final poem of Book I of Sappho, fragment 30.  A colophon at the end of fragment 56 of the papyrus shows that Sappho's Book I contained 1320 lines, or 330 stanzas.  Sappho's name is not preserved here; instead, the authorship of the fragments is established by the metre (Sapphic stanzas), dialect (Aeolic), and three overlaps with previously-known fragments attributed to Sappho.

The papyrus is now in the collection of the Bodleian Library.

See also
 Oxyrhynchus papyri
 Papyrus Oxyrhynchus 7

Notes

References

Works cited
 
 
 
 
 

2nd-century manuscripts
Bodleian Library collection
Greek-language papyri
Oxyrhynchus papyri vol. X
Works by Sappho